The Hitlist is a 2012 Indian action thriller film written, directed and produced by Bala (in his directorial debut). It was simultaneously shot in Malayalam and Kannada languages. The film stars Bala, Dhruv Sharma, and Aishwarya Devan, while Samudrakani, Thalaivasal Vijay, Riyaz Khan, Tini Tom, and Sasi Kalinga plays supporting roles. The film's music was composed by Alphons Joseph. The plot follows ACP Vikram Rathod, who is assigned to catch a serial killer who has been murdering police officers.

The film completed production in late-June 2012. The Hitlist was released in theatres on 7 December 2012.

Plot

Cast

 Bala as ACP Vikram Rathod IPS
 Dhruva Sharma as Druv
 Aishwarya Devan as Avanthika
 Riyaz Khan as CI Simon
 Krishna as Anand
 Thalaivasal Vijay as IG Robert IPS
 Sreejith Ravi as Peter
 Sasi Kalinga as Madhavan
 Tini Tom as Stephen 
 Riza Bava as DGP
 Suresh Krishna as Commissioner
 Kiran Raj as SP
 Samudrakani as DSP Anapazhakan
 Sandhya as Gouri
 Sukanya as Herself
 Unni Mukundan as SI Ajai Kumar (Cameo appearance)
 Narain as Dr. Lewis (Cameo appearance)

Production
The Hitlist marks the directorial debut of actor Bala. Screenplay was also written by him. He also played the lead role, while Kannada actors Dhruv Sharma and Aishwarya Devan portrayed other two principal characters. Filming began in Kochi. Initially, Prithviraj Sukumaran and Unni Mukundan were supposed to make cameo appearances. In the film, Mukundan and Narain appeared in cameo roles. Bala also produced the film. The film was simultaneously shot in Malayalam and Kannada languages. Mohanlal and Kiccha Sudeep did voice-over in Malayalam and Kannada versions, respectively.

Soundtrack
The soundtrack features three songs composed by Alphons Joseph . The lyrics were written by Santhosh Varma & Jophy Tharakan.

 Track listing

Reception
The Hitlist was released in theatres on 7 December 2012. A critic rated the film 5.5 in a scale of 10 and wrote that the film is "a hotch-potch of many Hollywood thrillers and more faithful replica of Jason Statham's Blitz, it "may partially satisfy the demands of the die hard fans of action films". While the cinematography and Dhruv's acting was praised, screenplay and Bala's unconvincing portrayal of the lead role was criticised.

References

External links
 The Hitlist at JioCinema
 

2012 films
2012 directorial debut films
2010s Malayalam-language films
2010s Kannada-language films
Indian action thriller films
2012 action thriller films